Yuán or Yuanfen, "fateful coincidence," is a concept in Chinese society describing good and bad chances and potential relationships. It can also be translated as "destiny, luck as conditioned by one's past", or "natural affinity among friends." It is comparable to the concept of karma in Buddhism, but yuanfen is interactive rather than individual.  The driving forces and causes behind yuánfèn are said to be actions done in previous incarnations.

Scholars Yang Kuo-shu and David Ho have analysed the psychological advantages of this belief: by assigning causality of negative events to yuanfen beyond personal control, people tend to maintain good relationships, avoid conflict, and promote social harmony; likewise, when positive events are seen as result of yuanfen, personal credit is not directly assigned, which reduces pride on one side of the relationship and envy and resentment on the other.

Role in society
Yang Kuo-shu and David Ho trace the origins of the term to traditional Buddhism and observe that yuan  or yuanfen are important concepts. Yang and Ho's research found that these concepts are still very much alive in Chinese social life and culture among university students. The concepts of yuan and yuanfen and beliefs in predestination and fatalism have waned, and belief in yuan has waned as well, but continuity with past conceptions is still strong.

Marc Moscowitz, an anthropologist, finds that yuanfen appears frequently in contemporary popular music. Here yuanfen refers to a “karmic relationship” with someone who was known in a previous life and is used to explain the end of a relationship that was not destined to work out.

Popular usage

 The proverbial saying "have fate without destiny" (有緣無分) refers to couples who were fated to come together, but not destined to stay together, and as such is sometimes used as a break-up line.
 Upon meeting a person (of any gender) who is hard to find, one might aptly exclaim: "It is yuánfèn that has brought us together!"
 When one encounters another repeatedly in various locations such that it seems to be more than coincidence, one can refer to yuánfèn.
 As a counter-example, when two people know each other, e.g. as penpals, but never have the opportunity to meet face-to-face, it can be said that their yuánfèn is too superficial or thin. Literally: It takes hundreds of rebirths to bring two persons to ride in the same boat; it takes a thousand eons to bring two persons to share the same pillow. This goes to show just how precious yuánfèn is.
 An alternative of this proverb is:  (pinyin: shí nián xiū dé tóng chuán dù, bǎi nián xiū dé gòng zhěn mián), which means literally: ten years of meditation (or good deeds) bring two people to cross a river in the same ferry, and a hundred years of meditation (or good deeds) bring two people to rest their heads on the same pillow. It conveys the same message.
 It is important to note that although yuanfen is often used in the context of lovers' relationships, the concept itself is much broader and can refer to any relationship between people under any circumstance. For example, yuanfen can be thought of as the mechanism by which family members have been "placed" in each other's lives. On the other hand, even two strangers sitting next to each other on a short-haul plane ride are also thought to have a certain amount of yuanfen. The line of reasoning follows roughly as such: out of the seven billion or so people living on this planet, the odds of two specific persons riding in an airplane together are astronomically small. Thus, two specific persons riding together on a plane have beaten out all odds to end up in those specific seats. If, in addition to their chance encounter, they happen to strike up an engaging conversation and find that they have common interests—perhaps in cinema, music, and/or photography—it makes their meeting all the more precious, and the depth of their yuanfen all the more noteworthy.

Translations

"Affinity occasion" could be a good translation of yuánfèn since yuánfèn really depends on the probability or a number of chances of meeting (or seeing) someone in the real world at any given time and space/place, however, although in reality haven't yet known each other for very long time, both persons felt as if they have already known each other for a very long time.

The concept of "synchronicity" from the Swiss psychologist Carl Jung is a good English translation of yuanfen. The French writer Émile Deschamps claims in his memoirs that in 1805, he was treated to some plum pudding by a stranger named Monsieur de Fontgibu. Ten years later, the writer encountered plum pudding on the menu of a Paris restaurant and wanted to order some, but the waiter told him that the last dish had already been served to another customer, who turned out to be de Fontgibu. Many years later, in 1832, Deschamps was at a dinner and once again ordered plum pudding. He recalled the earlier incident and told his friends that only de Fontgibu was missing to make the setting complete—and in the same instant, the now senile de Fontgibu entered the room.

Often yuánfèn is said to be the equivalent of "fate" (as is with the title of a 1984 movie, given the western name Behind the Yellow Line, starring Leslie Cheung) or "destiny". However, these words do not have the element of the past playing a role in deciding the outcome of the uncertain future. The most common Chinese term for "fate" or "destiny" is mìngyùn (literally "the turn of events in life").

"Providence" and "predestination" are not exact translations, because these words imply that the things happen by the will of God or gods, whereas yuánfèn does not necessarily involve divine intervention.

See also
 Chinese social relations
 Serendipity
Wu
 Bao ying
 Ming yun

References

Sources
 Fan, Lizhu, and Chen Na (2013) The Revival of Indigenous Religion in China. Fudan University.
   
 .

Concepts in Chinese folk religion
Chinese culture
Chinese words and phrases
Buddhism in China